The Ambassador Extraordinary and Plenipotentiary of Ukraine to Sweden is the ambassador of Ukraine to the Kingdom of Sweden. The current ambassador is Ihor Sahach. He assumed the position in November 2011. 

The first Ukrainian ambassador to the Kingdom of Sweden assumed his post in 1992, the same year a Ukrainian embassy opened in Stockholm.

List of ambassadors

Cossack Hetmanate
 1653–1653 Syluyan Muzhylovsky (presumably)

Ukrainian People's Republic
 1918–1918 Borys Bazhenov
 1919–1921 Kostyantyn Losky

Ukraine
 1993–1994 Kostyantyn Masyk (Ambassador of Ukraine to Finland and concurrently to Sweden)
 1994–1997 Ihor Sahach
 1997–1999 Ihor Podolyev
 1999–2002 Oleksandr Slipchenko
 2002–2004 Leonid Kozhara
 2004–2004 Oleksandr Danyleiko
 2004–2006 Eduard Terpytsky (provisional)
 2006–2008 Anatoliy Ponomarenko
 2008–2011 Yevhen Perebyinis
 2011–2014 Valeriy Stepanov
 2015–2019 Ihor Sahach

External links 
  Embassy of Ukraine to Sweden: Previous Ambassadors

 
Sweden
Ukraine